Chu Anping (1909–1966?) was a Chinese scholar, liberal journalist and editor of Guancha (观察, The Observer) in the Civil War era of the late 1940s. He is widely considered to be one of the most famous liberals in China. He was Editor of the China Democratic League newspaper "for intellectuals", the Guangming Daily, in the PRC era. Following publication of his article entitled "The Party Dominates the World", he was attacked by Mao Zedong in the Hundred Flowers Campaign of 1957 and purged during the Anti-Rightist Movement.  It is believed that he committed suicide in 1966. He was father to Chu Wanghua, a contemporary Chinese composer based in Australia, and grandfather to Mark Chu, a multidisciplinary artist.

Career outline
 1932 graduated from the English department, Kwang Hua University, Shanghai.
 1933 appointed editor of Central Daily (Nanjing) supplement.
 1936 travelled to England to collect political texts, studying at the University of Edinburgh.
 September 1, 1946 organized Observer semi-monthly publication, let the organization head and chief editor. On December 25, 1948 is sealed up by Kuomintang.
 1954 was appointed September Third Society members of the Central Committee concurrently propaganda department vice-minister, and no matter what National People's Congress represented.
 April 1, 1957 Chu was appointed Guangming Daily editor-in-chief.

Biography
On June 1, 1957, at the symposium convened by the Department for United Front Work of the CCP Central Committee, Chu made a speech entitled "Comment made to Chairman Mao And Premier Zhou," which stated that Mao Zedong had seen the "world [as the] party's". Both the government and the people felt the tremendous reverberations. People's Daily and Guangming Daily both published the full text the next day with banner headlines and in a prominent position.

In January 1958, in the Anti-Rightist Movement Chu was labelled a "anti-party anti-people anti-socialism bourgeois rightist".

Disappearance
In 1966 at the start of the Cultural Revolution, Chu was persecuted, then soon went missing. His whereabouts were unknown and it was believed that he was either beaten to death by Red Guards or committed suicide. In 2015, a funeral was finally held for Chu in his home county, Yixing. Photographs and a book were placed in an urn and buried in a symbolic grave by his three sons. State-run media said it was not a moment to re-evaluate the past, and his son Chu Wanghua said “Today is not a sad day. Today is a day of commemoration and remembrance.”

See also
 List of people who disappeared

References

Citations

Sources 

 Young-Tsu Wong, "The Fate of Liberalism in Revolutionary China: Chu Anping and His Circle, 1946–1950," Modern China, Vol. 19, No. 4 (Oct., 1993), pp. 457–490.

1909 births
1960s missing person cases
1966 deaths
Alumni of the University of Edinburgh
Date of death missing
Guangming Daily people
Missing person cases in China
People from Yixing
Suicides during the Cultural Revolution
People's Republic of China journalists
People's Republic of China philosophers
Philosophers from Zhejiang
Place of birth missing
Place of death missing
Republic of China journalists
Republic of China philosophers
Writers from Wuxi
Victims of the Anti-Rightist Campaign